The following lists events that happened during 1989 in Chile.

Incumbents
President of Chile: Augusto Pinochet

Events 
1989 – 1989 Chilean grape scare

June
30 June – Chilean constitutional referendum, 1989

August
17 August - Chilean constitution significantly amended

December
14 December – Chilean general election, 1989

Births
9 January – Matías Celis
11 January – Carlos Escudero
9 March – Ariel Salinas
17 April – Charles Aránguiz
17 May – Juan Carlos Sanhueza
27 July – David Llanos
5 August – Adrián Faúndez
19 August – Orlando Gutiérrez (Chilean footballer)

Deaths
26 August – Andrés Sabella (b. 1912)

References 

 
Years of the 20th century in Chile
Chile